Liberty Township is a township in Clarke County, Iowa, USA.  As of the 2000 census, its population was 373.

Geography
According to the USGS, it contains five cemeteries: Bethel Chapel, Harrison, Liberty, Rhodes and Twyford.

The streams of Middle Otter Creek, North Otter Creek and Victory Creek run through this township.

References
 USGS Geographic Names Information System (GNIS)

External links
 US-Counties.com
 City-Data.com

Townships in Clarke County, Iowa
Townships in Iowa